20 series may refer to:

Electronics 

 GeForce 20 series graphics processing units made by Nvidia

Train Types 
 Kyoto Municipal Subway 20 series operating for the Kyoto Municipal Subway
 Osaka Municipal Subway New 20 series electric multiple unit operating for Osaka Metro